In the early night of May 19, 2022, a fuel tanker collided with another truck carrying logs of woods close of Ajaypur near Chandrapur, Maharashtra. After which a fire broke out killing nine people. The fire brigade personnel reached the spot in an hour and pacified the fire a few hours later.

The accident took place on Thursday around 10.30 pm on Chandrapur-Mul Road. The bodies of the victims were brought to Chandrapur hospital.

References 

Chandrapur tanker-truck crash
Chandrapur tanker-truck crash
Chandrapur tanker-truck crash
Road incidents in India
Chandrapur tanker-truck crash